The Canton of Vaugneray is a French administrative division, located in the Rhône department.

The canton was established in 1790 and modified by decree of 27 February 2014 which came into force in March 2015.

Composition 
The canton of Vaugneray is composed of 18 communes:

See also
Cantons of the Rhône department
Communes of the Rhône department

References

Cantons of Rhône (department)
1790 establishments in France